Arrow squid is a common name for a squid.

Species called arrow squids include:

Doryteuthis plei, the slender inshore squid
Heterololigo bleekeri, the spear squid
Nototodarus gouldi, Gould's squid
Nototodarus sloanii, the New Zealand arrow squid

References

Former disambiguation pages converted to set index articles
Squid